Carrie Rickey (born November 26, 1952) is a feminist American art and film critic. Rickey is the film critic at The Philadelphia Inquirer and often contributes to The New York Times, San Francisco Chronicle and Village Voice.

Her essays are collected in many books including The American Century and American Movie Critics. Rickey was an early champion of women filmmakers including Gillian Armstrong, Kathryn Bigelow and Ava DuVernay. During her tenure as a movie reviewer she covered technological evolutions in the industry from the video revolution to the rise of digital film, and has profiled artists and filmmakers from Clint Eastwood and Sidney Poitier to Elizabeth Taylor and Nora Ephron.

Biography 
Rickey grew up in Los Angeles, California, where she developed a lifelong interest in film. She attended the University of California, San Diego (AB 1974, MFA 1976) where she studied with Manny Farber and worked as his teaching assistant. Between 1975 and 1976 Rickey participated in the Whitney Museum of American Art's Independent Study Program.

Career 
From 1980 to 1983, Rickey was a film critic at the Village Voice. She wrote one of the first retrospectives of the work of filmmaker Ida Lupino and one of the first considerations of filmmaker David Cronenberg. She then became a film critic for The Boston Herald (1984–85) and also wrote for Artforum and Art in America as an art critic.

In 1986, she became the film critic at The Philadelphia Inquirer.
Rickey has served on numerous juries, including the New York Film Festival in 1988-1991.

Rickey has written essays on many artists such as Leon Golub and Philip Guston and wrote the Criterion Collection essays for Broadcast News and Videodrome.

She is included in the book Feminists Who Changed America for her role in chronicling the work and the progress of women artists and filmmakers in articles and catalogue essays.

Rickey contributed chapters to The Power of Feminist Art, The Rolling Stone Illustrated History of Rock and Roll, among many other collections.

In 2018, she won the award for Best Commentary (Film/Television) from the L.A. Press Club for her serve, "What Ever Happened to Women Directors?" and won a regional Emmy (Mid-Atlantic division) for best Documentary for the film, "Before Hollywood: Philadelphia and the Birth of the Movies."

References

American film critics
The Philadelphia Inquirer people
1952 births
Living people
American women film critics
American women critics
American art critics
American women art critics